The 1987 Skate Canada International was held in Calgary, Alberta on October 29–31. It was the test event for the 1988 Winter Olympics. Medals were awarded in the disciplines of men's singles, ladies' singles, pair skating, and ice dancing.

Results

Men
Five of seven judges preferred Orser in the free skate. Boitano took the silver medal and bronze went to Viktor Petrenko, who fell three times.

Ladies
The judges were divided in the free skate; four of seven voted in favour of Thomas.

Pairs

Ice dancing

References

Skate Canada International, 1987
Skate Canada International
1987 in Canadian sports 
1987 in Alberta